Sleepy Hollow Farm is a historic home located near Leesburg, Loudoun County, Virginia.  The house was built in two phases, one in 1769 and another about 1820.  The original section is a two-story, side-gable, three-bay, stone dwelling with a side gable roof. The interior exhibits stylistic influences of the Federal style.  Attached to it is a one-story, two-bay, stone addition built about 1820. It has a one-story section added about 1980.  Also on the property is a contributing stone spring house.

It was listed on the National Register of Historic Places in 2007.

References

Houses on the National Register of Historic Places in Virginia
Federal architecture in Virginia
Houses completed in 1769
Houses in Loudoun County, Virginia
National Register of Historic Places in Loudoun County, Virginia
1769 establishments in Virginia